Karimabad-e Sardar (also Romanized as Karīmābād-e Sardār) is a village in Mahan Rural District, Mahan District, Kerman County, Kerman Province, Iran. At the 2006 census, its population was 13, in 4 families.

References 

Populated places in Kerman County